Bruchidius mendosus, is a species of leaf beetle found in India, Sri Lanka, Bhutan, Iran, Myanmar, Nepal, Thailand, Vietnam, and Yemen.

Description
Body length is less than 1.5 mm. Elytral vestiture is uniform. Antennae short, and dark brown with blackish apical segment. Antennal segments are longer than wide. Posterior legs are black.

It is a seed borer commonly found in Grona triflora seeds and probably in Alysicarpus monilifer.

References 

Bruchinae
Insects of Sri Lanka
Beetles described in 1839